GOP, short for Grand Old Party, is a nickname for the Republican Party of the United States of America.

GOP or Gop may also refer to:

Computing 
 Graphics Output Protocol, a component of the Unified Extensible Firmware Interface
 Group of pictures, used in video coding

Places 
 The Gop, a neolithic mound in Wales
 Gop, Odisha, India
 Górnośląski Okręg Przemysłowy, a conurbation in Poland

Other uses 
 Gatesville Municipal Airport (FAA code), in Texas, United States
 Government of Pakistan
 Gross operating profit
 Guardians of Peace, a hacker group
 Mahayogi Gorakhnath Airport (IATA code), in Uttar Pradesh, India
 Yeretuar language (ISO 639-3 code), an Austronesian language spoken in Indonesian Papua

See also 
 Gaziosmanpaşa (disambiguation)